Takahiko Ishikawa (石川隆彦, Ishikawa Takahiko, 1917–2008) was an  All Japan Judo Champion.  In the 1949  All-Japan Judo Championships Tahahiko fought Masahiko Kimura to a draw. In the following year he became the champion and subsequently placed three more times in the semi finals and then retired.

Judo
He would teach in Havana Cuba and help to bring it up to an elite level. Takahiko taught Judo in Philadelphia as well as Virginia Beach.  For many years he was the highest ranking black belt in the United States. He became 9th Dan before he died.

Media
Tahahiko is the author of Judo Training Methods: A SOURCEBOOK

References

Japanese male judoka
1917 births
2008 deaths
Expatriates in Cuba
Japanese expatriates in the United States
20th-century Japanese people
21st-century Japanese people